

Events

January–March 

 January 1
 The legislative union of Great Britain and Ireland is completed under the Act of Union 1800, bringing about the United Kingdom of Great Britain and Ireland, and the abolition of the Parliament of Ireland.
 Giuseppe Piazzi discovers the asteroid and dwarf planet Ceres.
 January 3 – Toussaint Louverture triumphantly enters Santo Domingo, the capital of the former Spanish colony of Santo Domingo, which has become a colony of Napoleonic France.
 January 31 – John Marshall is appointed Chief Justice of the United States.
 February 4 – William Pitt the Younger resigns as Prime Minister of the United Kingdom.
 February 9 – The Treaty of Lunéville ends the War of the Second Coalition between France and Austria.  Under the terms of the treaty, all German territories left of the Rhine are officially annexed by France while Austria also has to recognize the Batavian, Helvetian, Cisalpine and Ligurian Republic.
 February 17 – An electoral tie between Thomas Jefferson and Aaron Burr is resolved, when Jefferson is elected President of the United States and Burr Vice President by the United States House of Representatives.
 February 27 – Washington, D.C. is placed under the jurisdiction of the United States Congress.
 March 4 – Thomas Jefferson is sworn in as the third President of the United States.
 March 10 – The first census is held in Great Britain. The population of England and Wales is determined to be 8.9 million, with London revealed to have 860,035 residents. 1.5 million people live in cities of 20,000 or more in England and Wales, accounting for 17% of the total English population.
 March 14 – Henry Addington becomes First Lord of the Treasury and Chancellor of the Exchequer, effectively Prime Minister of the United Kingdom.
 March 21 – Battle of Alexandria in Egypt: British troops defeat the French, but the British commander, Sir Ralph Abercromby, dies later of a wound received in the action.
 March 23 – Tsar Paul I of Russia is murdered; he is succeeded by his son Alexander I.

April–June 
 April 2 – War of the Second Coalition – First Battle of Copenhagen: The  British Royal Navy, under Admiral Sir Hyde Parker, forces the Royal Dano-Norwegian Navy to accept an armistice. Vice-Admiral Horatio Nelson leads the main attack, deliberately disregarding his commander's signal to withdraw. He is created a Viscount on May 19; Denmark-Norway is forced to withdraw from the Second League of Armed Neutrality.
 April 21 – Ranjit Singh is invested, as Maharaja of Punjab.
 May 6 – French Revolutionary Wars – Action of 6 May 1801 off Barcelona: British Royal Navy brig HMS Speedy, although outmanned and outgunned, captures the 32-gun Spanish frigate El Gamo.
 May 10 – The pascha of Tripoli declares war on the United States, by having the flagpole on the consulate chopped down.
 June 7 – War of the Oranges ends: Portugal and Spain sign the Treaty of Badajoz; Portugal loses the city of Olivenza.
 June 15 – A bull breaks through barriers at a bullfight in Madrid, killing two people (including the mayor of Torrejón de Ardoz) and injuring a number of other spectators.
 June 27 – Siege of Cairo ends: Cairo falls to British troops.

July–September 
 July 6 – Battle of Algeciras: The French fleet defeats the British fleet.
 July 7 – Toussaint Louverture promulgates a reforming constitution for Santo Domingo, declaring himself emperor for life of the entire island of Hispaniola, and nominally abolishing slavery.
 July 12 – Second Battle of Algeciras: The British fleet defeats the French and Spanish fleets.
 July 18 – Napoleon signs a Concordat with Pope Pius VII.
 August 1 – First Barbary War – Action of 1 August 1801: United States Navy schooner  captures the 14-gun Tripolitan corsair polacca Tripoli off the north African coast, in a single-ship action.
 September 9 – Alexander I of Russia confirms the privileges of the Baltic provinces.
 September 24 – Joseph Marie Jacquard exhibits his new invention, a loom where the pattern being woven is controlled by punched cards, at the National Exposition in Paris.
 September 30 – The Treaty of London is signed for preliminary peace between the French First Republic and the United Kingdom of Great Britain and Ireland.

October–December 
 October 17 – A coup d'état is staged in the Batavian Republic.
 November 16 – The first edition of the New-York Evening Post is printed.
 December 15 – Hadži Mustafa Pasha, Ottoman commander and politician, is assassinated in Belgrade, Sanjak of Smederevo, by Kučuk-Alija.
 December 19 – South Carolina College, a precursor to The University of South Carolina, is established in Columbia, South Carolina.
 December 24 – Cornish engineers Richard Trevithick and Andrew Vivian demonstrate "Puffing Devil", their steam-powered road locomotive, in Camborne. The trial is successful but Trevithick realises the limitations of steam power in a road-running vehicle and turns his attention to rail, introducing the world's first steam railway locomotive in 1804.

Date unknown 

 The first of a continuous series of censuses is held in France.
 Thomas Bruce, 7th Earl of Elgin, British ambassador to the Ottoman Empire, begins removal of the Elgin Marbles from the Parthenon in Athens.
 Philippe Pinel publishes Traité médico-philosophique sur l'aliénation mentale; ou la manie, presenting his enlightened humane psychological approach to the management of psychiatric hospitals. Translated into English by D. D. Davis as Treatise on Insanity in 1806, it is influential on both sides of the Atlantic during the nineteenth century.
 Ultraviolet radiation is discovered by Johann Wilhelm Ritter.
 The magnum opus Disquisitiones Arithmeticae of Carl Friedrich Gauss is published.
 The Supreme Council, Scottish Rite (Southern Jurisdiction, USA) is founded within Freemasonry.

Births

January–June 

 January 3 – Gijsbert Haan, Dutch-American religious leader (d. 1874)
 January 10 – Thierry Hermès, German-born French businessman, founder of Hermès (d. 1878)
 January 11 – Honório Hermeto Carneiro Leão, Marquis of Paraná, Brazilian politician (d. 1856)
 January 14 – Jane Welsh Carlyle, wife of Scottish essayist Thomas Carlyle (d. 1866)
 February 1
 Jean-Baptiste Boussingault, French chemist (d. 1887)
 Thomas Cole, American artist (d. 1848)
 February 13 – János Kardos, Hungarian Slovenes evangelical priest, teacher and writer (d. 1875)
 February 21 – John Henry Newman, English Catholic Cardinal (d. 1890)
 May 5 – Pío Pico, last Governor of Alta California (d. 1894)
 May 9 – Peter Hesketh-Fleetwood, English Member of Parliament, developer (d. 1866)
 May 11 – Henri Labrouste, French architect (d. 1875)
 May 16 – William H. Seward, 24th United States Secretary of State (d. 1872)
 May 17 – Lovisa Åhrberg, first woman doctor, surgeon in Sweden (d. 1881)
 May 31 – Johann Georg Baiter, Swiss philologist, textual critic (d. 1877)
 June 1 – Brigham Young, American Mormon leader, colonizer (d. 1877)
 June 5 – William Scamp, English architect and engineer (d. 1872)
 June 4 – James Pennethorne, English architect (d. 1871)
 June 14 – Heber C. Kimball, American religious leader (d. 1868)
 June 16 – Julius Plücker, German mathematician, physicist (d. 1868)
 June 24 – Caroline Clive, English writer (d. 1873)
 June 30 – Frédéric Bastiat, French philosopher (d. 1850)

July–December 

 July 5 – David Farragut, American admiral (d. 1870)
 July 14 – Johannes Peter Müller, German physiologist, comparative anatomist, ichthyologist, and herpetologist (d. 1858)
 July 27 – George Biddell Airy, English mathematician, astronomer (d. 1892)
 September 1 – Hortense Allart, French writer (d. 1879)
 September 3 – Christian Erich Hermann von Meyer, German palaeontologist (d. 1869)
 October 12
 – Friedrich Frey-Herosé, member of the Swiss Federal Council (d. 1873)
 – Carl August von Steinheil, German engineer, astronomer (d. 1870)
 October 23 – Albert Lortzing, German composer (d. 1851)
 November 3
 Karl Baedeker, German author, publisher (d. 1859)
 Vincenzo Bellini, Italian composer (d. 1835)
 November 10 – Vladimir Dal, Russian lexicographer (d. 1872)
 November 13 – Queen Elisabeth Ludovika of Bavaria, queen of Prussia (d. 1873)
 December 11 – Christian Dietrich Grabbe, German writer (d. 1836)

Date unknown 
 Dai Xi, Chinese painter (d. 1860)
 Franciszek Ksawery Godebski, Polish writer (d. 1869)
 Brita Sofia Hesselius, Swedish photographer (d. 1866)
 Cynthia Taggart, American poet (d. 1849)

Deaths

January–June 

 January 2 – Johann Kaspar Lavater, Swiss physiognomist (b. 1741)
 January 11 – Domenico Cimarosa, Italian composer (b. 1749)
 February 7 – Daniel Chodowiecki, Polish painter (b. 1726)
 February 17 – Princess Philippine Charlotte of Prussia (b. 1716)
 March 14 – Margarita "Peggy" Schuyler Van Rensselaer, American socialite, Angelica Schuyler Church's sister (b. 1758)
 March 19 – Ambrosio O'Higgins, 1st Marquis of Osorno, Spanish viceroy of Peru and Governor of the Captaincy General of Chile, father of Bernardo O'Higgins
 March 21 – Andrea Luchesi, Italian composer (b. 1741)
 March 23 – Tsar Paul I of Russia (b. 1754)
 March 25 – Novalis, German poet (b. 1772)
 March 28 – Ralph Abercromby, British general (b. 1734)
 April 2 – Thomas Dadford, Jr., British engineer
 April 7 – Noël François de Wailly, French lexicographer (b. 1724)
 May 3 – Cyrus Trapaud, British Army general (b. 1715)
 May 17 – William Heberden, English physician (b. 1710)
 June 4 – Frederick Muhlenberg, first Speaker of the U.S. House of Representatives (b. 1750)
 June 14 – Benedict Arnold, American Revolution hero, then traitor (b. 1741)

July–December 

 July 4 – Leendert Viervant the Younger, Dutch architect (b. 1752)
 August 13 – George Gordon, 3rd Earl of Aberdeen (b. 1722)
 August 31 – Nicola Sala, Italian opera composer (b. 1713)
 September 19 – Johann Gottfried Koehler, German astronomer (b. 1745)
 October 3 – Philippe Henri, marquis de Ségur, Marshal of France (b. 1724)
 November 4 – William Shippen, American physician, Continental Congressman (b. 1712)
 November 5
 Humphry Marshall, American botanist (b. 1722)
 Motoori Norinaga, Japanese philologist, scholar (b. 1730)
 November 24
 Franz Moritz von Lacy, Austrian field marshal (b. 1725)
 Philip Hamilton, son of American soldier and statesman, Alexander Hamilton (b. 1782)

Date unknown 
 Ulrica Arfvidsson, Swedish fortune teller (b. 1734)

References